Darby is a borough in Delaware County, Pennsylvania, United States. The borough of Darby is distinct from the nearby municipality of Darby Township.

History
Darby was settled in 1682 by seven Quaker families led by abolitionist & fair trade avocate John Blunston. The name Darby is derived from the English city of Derby (pronounced "Darby"), the county town of Derbyshire (pronounced "Darbyshire"), the origin of many early settlers. Incorporated on May 3, 1853, it had 3,429 residents in 1900, 6,305 in 1910, 10,334 in 1940, and 10,687 at the 2010 census.

Darby founder John Blunston immigrated to Pennsylvania in October 1682.  He was involved in real estate, agriculture, and goods trading.  An early Quaker settler, Blunston was a close associate of William Penn and an active political figure in early Pennsylvania.  He first served in the Colonial Assembly from 1683 to 1688.  In this early stage of provincial government, Blunston became a strong proponent for the rights of the Assembly.  In 1685 Blunston was appointed to a committee that argued against the Provincial Council's practice of enacting laws without legislative approval.  In the same year, Blunston led the Assembly in their attempt to impeach Chief Justice Nicholas More.  Blunston returned to the Assembly for the 1695 term.  During his second period of service in the Assembly, he was elected the 12th Speaker of the Assembly on May 10, 1697.  He was re-elected Speaker on May 10, 1699, and again on May 10, 1700.  During this time he was instrumental in drafting a new frame of government for the Province.  He retired from the Assembly after the 1701 term.

In addition to Blunston's service in the Assembly, he served as a Provincial Councilor starting in 1700 and ending in 1723. He served as justice of the peace for Chester County from 1684 to 1693 and again from 1695 to 1703.  He was also actively involved with Darby Quaker Meeting House in Chester County (now Delaware County), and was one of the Quakers who fought to cease the slave trade amongst Friends.  He called upon purchasers to boycott products made by slaves as stolen products, thus advocating what we would call today a "Fair Trade" policy. He represented the Chester Quarterly Meeting at the Philadelphia Yearly Meeting of Friends 17 times between 1688 and 1715.

Darby is home to the fifth-oldest all-volunteer Fire Department and the Darby Free Library, one of the oldest libraries in the United States, founded in 1743.The Darby Friends Burial Ground is the oldest Cemetery in Pennsylvania in continuous use, opened in 1682.

The first temperance society in Pennsylvania, of which a record has been found was that of "Darby Association for Discouraging the Unnecessary Use of Spirituous Liquors" organized in Delaware County in 1819, at the Darby Friends Meetinghouse. (Pg 20 Temperance Movement Prior to the Civil War, Asa Earl Martin; The PA Magazine of History & Biography, 1925 Vol 49 #3)

In 1833, three of the founding fourteen women to create the Pennsylvania Female Anti Slavery Society were members of the Darby Friends Meeting.

Violent racial incidents hit all over the country as part of the 1919 Red Summer. The Darby 1919 lynching attempt was the attempted lynching of Samuel Gorman of Darby on July 23, 1919. Samuel Gorman, a 17-year-old black boy, was sent to jail for the alleged murder of William E. Taylor.

Geography
It has a humid subtropical climate (Cfa) and average monthly temperatures range from 33.6 °F in January to 78.3 °F in July.

Demographics

As of the census of 2000, there were 10,299 people, 3,405 households and 2,393 families residing in the borough. The population density was 12,624.5 people per square mile (4,849.3/km2). There were 3,999 housing units at an average density of 4,902.0 per square mile (1,883.0/km2). The racial makeup of the borough was 36.37% White, 60.00% African American, 0.14% Native American, 0.87% Asian, 0.07% Pacific Islander, 0.51% from other races, and 2.04% from two or more races. Hispanic or Latino of any race were 0.95% of the population.

There were 3,405 households, out of which 41.3% had children under the age of 18 living with them, 34.1% were married couples living together, 30.0% had a female householder with no husband present, and 29.7% were non-families. 25.6% of all households were made up of individuals, and 9.0% had someone living alone who was 65 years of age or older. The average household size was 2.88 and the average family size was 3.45.

In the borough the population was spread out, with 33.4% under the age of 18, 7.7% from 18 to 24, 28.2% from 25 to 44, 17.1% from 45 to 64, and 13.6% who were 65 years of age or older. The median age was 32 years. For every 100 females, there were 85.7 males. For every 100 females age 18 and over, there were 75.3 males.

The median income for a household in the borough was $26,938, and the median income for a family was $30,065. Males had a median income of $35,507 versus $22,451 for females. The per capita income for the borough was $16,990. About 35.5% of families and 20.6% of the population were below the poverty line, including 27.6% of those under age 18 and 11.1% of those age 65 or over.

Darby is a relatively urban place, with almost twice the population density of nearby Darby Township. The Pennsylvania State Police reported that the crime rate (per capita)in 2011 compared to the per-capita rate for Delaware County as a whole was six times for violent crimes (murder, robbery and assault, not including sex crimes), 24 times for property crimes (including arson), but only two times for drug offenses (not including alcohol offenses).

Education
William Penn School District serves Darby.
Park Lane Elementary School (K-6)
Walnut Street Elementary School (K-6)
 Penn Wood Middle School (7-8)
 Penn Wood High School, Cypress Street Campus-Freshnman Academy (9)  (Yeadon)
 Penn Wood High School, Green Avenue Campus (10-12) (Lansdowne)

The city is also home to Blessed Virgin Mary (BVM), a parochial school affiliated with the Roman Catholic Church.

Transportation

U.S. Route 13 is the only numbered highway serving Darby. It follows a southwest-to-northeast alignment along MacDade Boulevard through the center of the borough.

Darby is served by the SEPTA Subway–Surface Trolley Lines number 11 and 13 at the Darby Transportation Center and the SEPTA Wilmington/Newark Line at the Darby station.

Darby once had three other railroad stations. Two, owned by the Baltimore and Ohio Railroad (now the Philadelphia Subdivision of CSX), one at Main and Sixth Streets, where the SEPTA Route 11 trolley crosses today, and the other, Boone Station, at Poplar Street and Lawrence Avenue The other, owned by the Pennsylvania Railroad, stood where the current station stands, and later across the tracks.

Politics 
Darby Borough is in Pennsylvania's 5th Congressional district, currently represented by Democrat Mary Gay Scanlon.
In the Pennsylvania legislature, Darby is represented by Democrat Joanna E. McClinton in the 191st House District.
Darby is in the 8th Pennsylvania Senate District, represented by Democrat Anthony H. Williams.

In local politics, Democrats hold an absolute majority of the borough's council seats, and the mayorship is held by Democrat Darren R. Burrell.

Notable people

 Stephen Barrar, member of the Pennsylvania House of Representatives, 160th district
 John Bartram, Quaker, early American botanist and father of the even more famous traveler and botanist William Bartram, was born in Darby and is buried there at the Friends Burial Ground at 12th and Main Street. His botanical garden exists nearby and is the oldest surviving botanical garden in the US.
 Leo Burt, placed on FBI "Ten Most Wanted" list for his role in the Sterling Hall bombing; born in Darby
 John Drew, Negro league baseball executive
 W.C. Fields, comedian and actor; born in 1880 at the Arlington Hotel, then located at 832 Main Street
 John Patrick Cardinal Foley, former Grand Master of the Equestrian Order of the Holy Sepulchre of Jerusalem and former president of the Pontifical Council for Social Communications, lived in retirement in Darby at the Villa St. Joseph of the Roman Catholic Archdiocese of Philadelphia
 Monica Horan, actress best known for her role as Amy MacDougall on Everybody Loves Raymond
 Jeff LaBar, rock guitarist for Cinderella
 Peter O'Keefe, member of the Pennsylvania House of Representatives, District 161 from 1975 to 1978
 John James Pearson (1800–1888), member of the U.S. House of Representatives
 Estelle Ricketts, first published African-American woman composer
 James N. Robertson, Pennsylvania state representative for Delaware County (1949-1952), brigadier general in the Pennsylvania National Guard
 Frank Sheeran, American mobster and trade unionist; portrayed in The Irishman by Robert De Niro
 John Stanford, former superintendent of the Seattle school district and United States Army officer; born in Darby
 Annis Boudinot Stockton, the first woman poet to be published in the British American colonies
 Chris Wheeler, sports broadcaster

References

  
 - Total pages: 334

External links

 
 Darby Borough Historical and Preservation Society local history collection, a finding aid

 
1698 establishments in Pennsylvania
Boroughs in Delaware County, Pennsylvania
Populated places established in 1698